Massonia is a genus of bulbous perennial flowering plants in the family Asparagaceae, subfamily Scilloideae (also treated as the family Hyacinthaceae). It is native to southern Africa, and is found in localities such as Namaqualand with hot and dry summers, being dormant in summer and growing during winter.
The genus Whiteheadia has been merged into Massonia. It is classed as a cryptophyte.

Description
Massonia grows from underground bulbs whose outer tunic is pale brown and papery or leathery. Two relatively broad leaves appear at the same time as the flowers, spreading out on either side, sometimes lying flat on the ground. The flowers are borne in a raceme, which may be short and held at ground level. There may be a "tuft" of green bracts at the top of the inflorescence. Individual flowers are pale in colour, white, or with green, yellow or pink tones. They are bell-shaped or somewhat tubular, with the tepals joined at the base forming a short or long tube. The stamens are more-or-less erect, with their filaments joined to the end of the tube formed by the tepals and also to each other, forming a small cup. The seeds are dull black.

The species Massonia depressa has been shown to be pollinated by rodents, including two species of gerbil (Gerbillurus paeba and Desmodillus auricularis). Very few species of plant are rodent-pollinated.

Systematics
The genus name was attributed to  Carl Peter Thunberg by Maarten Houttuyn in 1780. It honours the Scottish botanist and gardener Francis Masson. A molecular phylogenetic study showed Massonia to be monophyletic, but also that the two species of the genus Whiteheadia were placed separately at the base of the Massonia clade, rendering Whiteheadia paraphyletic. Accordingly, Manning et al. transferred W. bifolia and W. etesionamibensis to Massonia.

Massonia is the type genus of the subtribe Massoniinae which is placed in the tribe Hyacintheae (or the tribe Massonieae in the subfamily Hyacinthoideae for those who accept the family Hyacinthaceae). It is most closely related to the genus Lachenalia.

Species
, Plants of the World Online accepted the following species:

Massonia amoena 
Massonia angustifolia 
Massonia bakeriana 
Massonia bifolia 
Massonia calvata 
Massonia dentata 
Massonia depressa 
Massonia dregei 
Massonia echinata 
Massonia etesionamibensis 
Massonia gypsicola 
Massonia hirsuta 
Massonia inaequalis 
Massonia jasminiflora 
Massonia latebrosa 
Massonia longipes 
Massonia luteovirens 
Massonia mimetica 
Massonia obermeyerae 
Massonia pseudoechinata 
Massonia pustulata 
Massonia pygmaea 
Massonia roggeveldensis 
Massonia saniensis 
Massonia sempervirens 
Massonia sessiliflora 
Massonia setulosa 
Massonia tenella 
Massonia thunbergiana 
Massonia triflora 
Massonia wittebergensis

Cultivation
Massonia species have been described as "essentially plants for the collector". They require the protection of an alpine house or bulb frame in regions subject to frosts. Well-drained soil and a sunny situation are considered essential. They can be propagated by seed, flowering after at least two to four years.

References

 
Asparagaceae genera